This list of historical markers installed by the National Historical Commission of the Philippines (NHCP) in SOCCSKSARGEN (Region XII) is an annotated list of people, places, or events in the region that have been commemorated by cast-iron plaques issued by the said commission. The plaques themselves are permanent signs installed in publicly visible locations on buildings, monuments, or in special locations.

While many Cultural Properties have historical markers installed, not all places marked with historical markers are designated into one of the particular categories of Cultural Properties.

This article lists three (3) markers from the SOCCSKSARGEN.

Cotabato 
This article lists no markers from the Province of Cotabato.

Sarangani
This article lists one (1) marker from the Province of Sarangani.

South Cotabato
This article lists two (2) markers from the Province of South Cotabato.

Sultan Kudarat
This article lists no markers from the Province of Sultan Kudarat.

See also
List of Cultural Properties of the Philippines in Soccsksargen

References

Footnotes

Bibliography 

A list of sites and structures with historical markers, as of 16 January 2012
A list of institutions with historical markers, as of 16 January 2012

External links
A list of sites and structures with historical markers, as of 16 January 2012
A list of institutions with historical markers, as of 16 January 2012
National Registry of Historic Sites and Structures in the Philippines
Policies on the Installation of Historical Markers

History of Soccsksargen
Soccsksargen